Acleris strigifera is a species of moth of the family Tortricidae. It is found in China, Japan and Russia.

The wingspan is 19–22 mm. Adults are on wing from September, and after overwintering, to May.

References

Moths described in 1931
strigifera
Moths of Asia